Anigraeopsis is a monotypic moth genus of the family Euteliidae. Its only species, Anigraeopsis subalbiplaga, is found on New Guinea. Both the genus and species were first described by Warren in 1914.

References

Euteliinae
Noctuoidea genera
Monotypic moth genera